Atlassian Corporation is an Australian software company that develops products for software developers, project managers and other software development teams. The company is domiciled in Delaware, with global headquarters in Sydney, Australia, and US headquarters in San Francisco.

In the fourth fiscal quarter of 2022, Atlassian reported serving 242,623 customers in over 190 countries, with 10 million monthly active users. As of June 2022, the company had 8,813 employees internationally across 13 different countries.

History 
Mike Cannon-Brookes and Scott Farquhar founded Atlassian in 2002. The pair met while studying at the University of New South Wales in Sydney. They bootstrapped the company for several years, financing the startup with a $10,000 credit card debt.

The name is an ad hoc derivation from the titan Atlas in Greek mythology who had been punished to hold up the Heavens after the Greek gods had overthrown the Titans. (The usual form of the word is Atlantean.) The derivation was reflected in the company's logo used from 2011 through to the 2017 re-branding through a blue X-shaped figure holding up what is shown to be the bottom of the sky.

Atlassian released its flagship product, Jira – a project and issue tracker, in 2002. In 2004, it released Confluence, a team collaboration platform that lets users work together on projects, co-create content, and share documents and other media assets.

In July 2010, Atlassian raised $60 million in venture capital from Accel Partners. In June 2011, Atlassian announced revenue of $102 million, up 35% from the year before. In a 2014 restructuring, the parent company became Atlassian Corporation PLC of the UK, with a registered address in London—though the actual headquarters remained in Sydney.

In November 2015, Atlassian announced sales of $320 million, and Shona Brown was added to its board. On 10 December 2015, Atlassian made its initial public offering (IPO) on the NASDAQ stock exchange, under the symbol TEAM, putting the market capitalization of Atlassian at $4.37 billion. The IPO made its founders Farquhar and Cannon-Brookes Australia's first tech startup billionaires and household names in their native country, despite Atlassian being called a "very boring software company" in The New York Times for its focus on development and management software.

In March 2019, Atlassian's value was US$26.6 billion. Cannon-Brookes and Farquhar own approximately 30% each. In October 2020, Atlassian announced the end of support for their "Server" products with sales ending in February 2021 and support ending in February 2024 in order to focus on "Cloud" and "Data Center" editions.

In October 2021, Atlassian received approval to construct their new Headquarters in Sydney, which will anchor the Tech Central precinct. Their building is planned to be the world's tallest hybrid timber structure and will embody leading sustainability technologies and principles.

In March 2023, the firm announced layoffs of 500 employees, 5% of its workforce.

Sales setup 
Atlassian does not have a traditional sales team, relying instead on its website and its partner channel.

Acquisitions and product announcements 
Additional products include Crucible, FishEye, Bamboo, and Clover which target programmers working with a code base. FishEye, Crucible and Clover came into Atlassian's portfolio through the acquisition of another Australian software company, Cenqua, in 2007. In 2010, Atlassian acquired Bitbucket, a hosted service for code collaboration.

In 2012, Atlassian acquired HipChat, an instant messenger for workplace environments. Then in May 2012, Atlassian Marketplace was introduced as a website where customers can download plug-ins for various Atlassian products. That same year Atlassian also released Stash, a Git repository for enterprises, later renamed Bitbucket Server. Also, Doug Burgum became chairman of its board of directors in July 2012.

In 2013, Atlassian announced a Jira service desk product with full service-level agreement support. In April 2015, Atlassian announced that it had acquired Blue Jimp—the company behind Jitsi—to expand its video capabilities. In October 2018, the company announced that it was selling Jitsi to 8x8.

In May 2015, the company announced its acquisition of work chat company Hall, with the intention of migrating all of Hall's customers across to its own chat product HipChat. A small startup called Dogwood Labs in Denver, Colorado which had a product called StatusPage (that hosts pages updating customers during outages and maintenance) was acquired in July 2016.

In January 2017, Atlassian announced the purchase of Trello for $425 million. On 7 September 2017 the company launched Stride, a web chat alternative to Slack. Less than a year later, on 26 July 2018, Atlassian announced it was going to exit the chat business, that it had sold the intellectual property for HipChat and Stride to competitor Slack, and that it was going to shut down HipChat and Stride in 2019. As part of the deal, Atlassian took a small stake in Slack.

On 4 September 2018 the company acquired OpsGenie (a tool that generates alerts for helpdesk tickets) for $295 million. On 18 March 2019, the company announced that it had acquired Agilecraft for $166 million. On 17 October 2019, Atlassian completed acquisition of Code Barrel, makers of "Automation for Jira", available on Jira Marketplace.

On 12 May 2020, Atlassian acquired , a tool that generates helpdesk tickets from Slack conversations, for an undisclosed amount. On 30 July 2020, Atlassian announced the acquisition of Mindville, a provider of IT service management software, for an undisclosed amount. On 26 February 2021, Atlassian acquired cloud-based visualization and analytics company Chartio.

References

External links

 
 

 
2015 initial public offerings
Australian brands
Companies based in Sydney
Software companies of Australia
Software companies established in 2002
Australian companies established in 2002

Development software companies